Viviane Senna Lalli (born 14 June 1957) is a Brazilian entrepreneur and philanthropist. She is sister of the racing driver and three-times Formula 1 world champion Ayrton Senna (1960–1994), and mother of racing driver Bruno Senna (born 1983).

She is president of the Ayrton Senna Foundation, established in London in June 1994 and also of the Instituto Ayrton Senna organization, headquartered in São Paulo since November 1994.

Biography 
Viviane Senna was born in São Paulo to Milton Teodoro Guirado da Silva and Neide Senna da Silva.
In 1979 she graduated  in Psychology at the Pontificial Catholic University of São Paulo, specializing in Jungian psychology in the university's Sede Sapientiaes Institute. She worked as a psychotherapist for adult and children, and also supervised qualification groups and improvement of psychotherapists. She also coordinated study groups of deep psychology (advocated by Jung).

She received the Grand Prix 2012 BNP Paribas, that recognises worldwide leaders in the area of social investment, and was appointed one of the Leaders for the New Millennium of CNN/Time.

She is the only Brazilian member of the Fellow Adults of Boys of the World Prize together with Nelson Mandela (ex-president of South Africa), Silvia Renate Sommerlath (wife of the king of Sweden), and José Ramos-Horta (Nobel Prize winner), among others.

Businesswoman 
Viviane Senna manages the royalties of the Ayrton Senna brand that through its character Senninha (based on the driver) has been reproduced in more than 200 products, from bicycles to french fries.

Filmography 
Viviane Senna has been in three documentaries and two TV series.

References 

Pontifical Catholic University of São Paulo alumni
Brazilian businesspeople
20th-century Brazilian women
21st-century Brazilian women
1957 births
People from São Paulo
Brazilian psychologists
Brazilian women psychologists
Living people